Hunan Institute of Science and Technology is located besides the Lake Dongting at one of the most famous historic cities - Yueyang, Hunan, China, is the city's largest higher education institute offering a large variety of undergraduate level programs spanning sciences, engineering, arts, economics, management, law and education.

The institute, as of 2005, consists of 18 departments offering 34 undergraduate programs and boasts 102 professors, 315 associate professors, and more than 300 lecturers holding Ph.D. and master's degrees. The total enrollment stands at approximately 17,400 full-time students and 5,000 part-time mature students.

As of 2022, Hunan Institute of Science and Technology was ranked 719th in the world by SCImago Institutions Rankings. The Best Chinese Universities Ranking, also known as the "Shanghai Ranking", placed the university 315th in China.

References

External links
  

Universities and colleges in Hunan
2004 establishments in China
Educational institutions established in 2004